Gjert Martinus Markvardson Holsen (1855 – 1921) was a Norwegian politician for the Conservative Party.

He was born in Holsen. He served as a representative to the Norwegian Parliament from 1889 to 1897 and 1903 to 1912. During this time he served as President of the Lagting 1905–1906.

He was a member of Førde municipality council from 1887 to 1910. Outside politics he was a farmer.

References
Gjert Holsen at NRK Sogn og Fjordane County Encyclopedia 

1855 births
1921 deaths
Members of the Storting
Sogn og Fjordane politicians
Conservative Party (Norway) politicians